Just a Girl is Bonnie Pink's fifth studio album under the East West Japan label, released on October 24, 2001.

Track listing

Charts

Album

Singles

2001 albums
Bonnie Pink albums